New Pelion Hut is the largest alpine hut in the Cradle Mountain-Lake St Clair National Park in the Central Highlands of Tasmania, Australia

History
It was built in 2001.  It sleeps up to 60 people, in six separate rooms, and has a large common area that can be divided in two by a roller door. It is heated by a small gas heater that runs for 45-minute intervals.  New Pelion Hut is located approximately halfway along the Overland Track, approximately 100 m from the Douglas Creek, and is a popular base for several day walks.  Even though the hut is relatively new, it suffers from condensation.  It is recommended that some of the windows are to left ajar.

Facilities 
New Pelion Hut has similar facilities to most of the other huts on the Overland Track.  These include:
 Bunks (No Mattresses)
 Table & Benches
 Composting toilet
 Rainwater tank
 Tent Platforms
 Group Campsite (Tent platforms) 
 Helipad (Authorised use only)
 Gas Heater & clothes drying rack

Access 
New Pelion Hut is primarily accessed on foot.  There is a helipad located next to the hut, however this is mainly used for maintenance and emergencies.  There are three maintained walking tracks to access New Pelion Hut:
 The Overland Track from Cradle Mountain.
 The Overland Track from Lake St Clair.
 The Arm River Track from the North East (Near Lake Rowallan).

Surrounding Mountains

There are a number of mountains that can be accessed from New Pelion Hut.  These include:
 Mount Ossa (Highest Mountain in Tasmania, Australia)
 Mount Pelion East
 Mount Oakleigh
 Mount Thetis
 Mount Achilles
 Mount Pelion West

References

External links
 http://www.cradlehuts.com/index.html
 https://web.archive.org/web/20050306190403/http://www.parks.tas.gov.au/recreation/tracknotes/overland.html#huts

Mountain huts in Australia